Pierce Edmond O'Brien-Butler (12 January 1877 – 15 January 1902) was an Irish rugby union international player. He won six caps between 1897 and 1900. Pierce was a member of a titled family, the Barons Dunboyne. His own branch of the family originated in County Tipperary, where they lived at Bansha Castle in the 18th century.

He was killed in action during the Anglo-Boer War in 1902. His nephew was the cricketer Paget O'Brien-Butler.

References

Pierce O'Brien-Butler at Scrum.com
IRFU Profile

1877 births
1902 deaths
Irish rugby union players
Ireland international rugby union players
Monkstown Football Club players
Rugby union players from County Tipperary
Rugby union fullbacks